Señor Corazón (Mr. Heart) is the 1987 studio album by Venezuelan performer, José Luis Rodríguez "El Puma". The album was produced by Albert Hammond and includes the number-one song "Y Tú También Llorarás". However, it went almost unnoticed in Latin America where instead the song "Sueño Contigo" became a resounding success. Señor Corazón was nominated for Pop Album of the Year at the 1st Lo Nuestro Music Awards.

Track listing
"Sueño Contigo"
"Yo Quiero Ser Tu Amor"
"Recuerdos"
"Si Pudiera"
"Y Tu También Lloraras"
"Dame Dame"
"Dímelo"
"Por Esa Mujer"
"Señor Corazón"
"Quiero Cantarle A La Vida"

Personnel
The following information was provided by Allmusic:
Albert Hammond – vocals, producer, editing  
Jose Luis Rodríguez – percussion, performer
Roberto Livi – songwriting, vocals
Hector Maselli – creative consultant, realization  
Briant Arnet – mixing engineer  
Jim Preziosi – mixing  
Marnie Riley – mixing  
Stephen Shelton – mixing
Gary Wagner – mixing  
Bill Jackson – engineer  
Paulinho Da Costa – percussion  
Assa Drori – strings
Paul Jackson Jr. – guitar  
Randy Kerber – keyboards  
Abraham Laboriel – bass
Josh Sklair – guitar  
John "J.R." Robinson – drums
Mario Houben – graphic design, photography

References

1987 albums
José Luis Rodríguez (singer) albums
Spanish-language albums